The Charotar Education Society (CES) is an educational institute in Charotar region established on 16 April 1916. It educates students from kindergarten to post-graduate level, offering P.T.C., B.ED., Arts, Commerce and Science degree Colleges.

Stepping Stones of Charotar Education Society 

Education in Gujarat
Educational organisations based in India